Scott Joseph McKnight (born February 11, 1988) is a media executive, producer, writer, director and former professional football player. He played college football at Colorado and was drafted by the New York Jets in the 7th round of the 2011 NFL Draft.

College Football Career

University of Colorado, Boulder 
McKnight played college football at the University of Colorado, where he finished his career ranked 1st in receptions (215) and 1st in receiving touchdowns (22) while becoming the 10th player in NCAA history to catch at least one pass in every game he appeared in (49) and the 6th to do so without missing any games due to injury.

Statistics 

Source:

NFL Career

Pre-Draft

New York Jets
McKnight was drafted by the New York Jets in the seventh round of the 2011 NFL Draft. McKnight joined best friend Mark Sanchez, whom McKnight has known since he was eight years old. McKnight signed a four-year contract on July 29, 2011. Mcknight's only reception was a 14-yard touchdown against the Philadelphia Eagles. He was waived on September 2. McKnight was signed to the team's practice squad on September 20. He was placed on the practice squad injured reserve list on November 1, 2011 after suffering a torn ACL, MCL, PCL and meniscus in his left knee. McKnight was re-signed by the Jets on March 20, 2012. He was waived on August 6, 2012 after fracturing his left knee cap.

Entertainment

Executive | Producer | Writer 
McKnight wrote episodes of television for the CBS series, CSI: Cyber.  

McKnight is the co-founder of GOAT Farm Media.

Awards and nominations

Entrepreneur 
McKnight is an angel investor in the Connected Coaching technology platform, Asensei.

References

External links
New York Jets bio
Colorado Buffaloes bio

1988 births
Living people
Players of American football from California
American football wide receivers
Colorado Buffaloes football players
New York Jets players
Sportspeople from Newport Beach, California